Dericorythidae are a family of grasshoppers, in the Orthoptera: suborder Caelifera. Species in this family can be found in northern Africa, southern Europe and Asia.

Subfamilies and Genera
The Orthoptera Species File lists:

Conophyminae 
Authority: Mishchenko 1952
tribe Conophymini Mistshenko, 1952
 Conophyma Zubovski, 1898
 Conophymopsis Huang, 1983
 Tarbinskia Mishchenko, 1950
tribe unassigned
 Bienkoa Mishchenko, 1950
 Conophymacris Willemse, 1933
 Khayyamia Koçak, 1981
 Plotnikovia Umnov, 1930
 Zagrosia Descamps, 1967

Dericorythinae 
Authority: Jacobson & V.L. Bianchi 1902-1905
 Anamesacris Uvarov, 1934
 Bolivaremia Morales-Agacino, 1949
 Dericorys Serville, 1838
 Farsinella Bei-Bienko, 1948
 Pamphagulus Uvarov, 1929

Iranellinae 
Authority: Mishchenko 1952
 Iranella Uvarov, 1922
 Iraniobia Bei-Bienko, 1954
 Iraniola Bei-Bienko, 1954

References

External links
 
 
 ITIS: Dericorythidae
 

Caelifera
Orthoptera families
Dericorythidae